Westfield Fashion Square is a shopping mall in the Sherman Oaks and Van Nuys areas of Los Angeles, California. It is owned by Westfield Group. Its anchor stores are Bloomingdale's and Macy's.

The mall opened on April 22, 1962, as Bullock's Fashion Square, anchored by Bullock's and I. Magnin department stores. It was officially dedicated on August 13, 1962. Later known as Fashion Square Sherman Oaks, the mall added a Joseph Magnin store in 1966 and The Broadway department store in 1977. From 1988 to 1990, the outdoor mall was enclosed and double-decked with a Mediterranean theme. In 1994, the mall suffered serious damage from the Northridge earthquake. In 1996, Bullock's was converted into Macy's and The Broadway became Bloomingdale's—the result of Federated Department Stores buying out Carter Hawley Hale Stores, the Broadway's parent company.

The Westfield Group acquired a half-interest in the shopping center in 2002 and renamed it "Westfield Shoppingtown Fashion Square" in 2003, dropping the "Shoppingtown" name in June 2005.

Westfield Fashion Square underwent another major renovation in 2013, creating a more cosmopolitan look and an upgraded food court.

Westfield Fashion Square has been featured in many television and film productions, including Malcolm in the Middle, The Office, Clueless, and The Ellen DeGeneres Show.

Anchors
Bloomingdale's (220,000 sq. ft.)
Macy's (280,535 sq. ft.)

See also
 Westfield Group

References

External links
Official Westfield Fashion Square website
Sherman Oaks Chamber Of Commerce

Fashion Square
Shopping malls in the San Fernando Valley
Shopping malls established in 1962
Sherman Oaks, Los Angeles
Shopping malls in Los Angeles